"Queen of Kings" is a song by Norwegian-Italian singer Alessandra Mele, which was released on 9 January 2023. The song is set to represent Norway in the Eurovision Song Contest 2023 after winning Melodi Grand Prix 2023, Norway's national final for that year's Eurovision Song Contest. The track peaked at number one in Norway.

Composition 
In an interview with Eurovision fansite Eurovision Fun, Mele stated that the song is about showing "the power of women, but also the power of all people, about how important it is to feel yourself." Mele said that her experiences as a bisexual woman influenced the creation of the song.

Eurovision Song Contest

Melodi Grand Prix 2023 
The contest consists of three semi-finals and one final. "Queen of Kings" was selected to compete first in the first-semi final, where it would manage to qualify to the final.

Heading into the final, the song was considered a favorite to win Melodi Grand Prix 2023, being the favorite in reader polls on Eurovision fansites Wiwibloggs and ESCUnited. In the final, an international jury and a public televote was used, with both contributing 50% of the vote. "Queen of Kings" would manage to earn a total of 233 points, earning 104 points from the jury and 129 from the public, winning both halves of the vote and earning the Norwegian spot for the Eurovision Song Contest 2023.

At Eurovision 
According to Eurovision rules, all nations with the exceptions of the host country and the "Big Five" (France, Germany, Italy, Spain and the United Kingdom) are required to qualify from one of two semi-finals in order to compete for the final; the top ten countries from each semi-final progress to the final. The European Broadcasting Union (EBU) split up the competing countries into six different pots based on voting patterns from previous contests, with countries with favourable voting histories put into the same pot. On 31 January 2023, an allocation draw was held which placed each country into one of the two semi-finals, as well as which half of the show they would perform in. Norway has been placed into the first semi-final, to be held on 9 May 2023, and has been scheduled to perform in the first half of the show.

Charts

References 

2023 songs
2023 singles
Eurovision songs of Norway
Eurovision songs of 2023
Number-one singles in Norway